Louis I d'Orléans, Duke of Longueville (1480 – Beaugency, 1 August 1516), was a French aristocrat and general, Grand Chamberlain of France and governor of Provence.

Louis was the second son of François I, Duke of Longueville, and Agnes of Savoy. He succeeded his elder brother François II in 1512, and became Duke of Longueville, Count of Montgommery, Count of Tancarville, Prince of Châlet-Aillon, Marquis of Rothelin and viscount of Abberville. His paternal grandfather, Jean, Count of Dunois, was the illegitimate son of Louis I, Duke of Orléans – son of King Charles V of France.

On 16 August 1513, Louis was taken prisoner by the English at the battle of the Spurs when he attempted to bring relief to the siege of Thérouanne. He was sent to Catherine of Aragon, who first lodged him in the Tower of London while she dealt with the Scottish invasion and the battle of Flodden. Longueville was treated very well in England, having a relationship with Jane Popincourt. He stood in for Louis XII of France in the marriage ceremony with Mary Tudor in Greenwich Palace on 13 August 1514. 

Louis married in 1504, Johanna of Hachberg-Sausenberg ( –1543), daughter of Philip of Hochberg.
They had: 
 Claude (1508 – November 9, 1524), Duke of Longueville and peer of France
 Louis II (1510 – June 9, 1537), married Marie of Lorraine (Mary of Guise), succeeded his brother
 François (1513–1548), Marquis of Rothelin, married Jacqueline de Rohan and had issue: 
 Léonor d'Orléans, duc de Longueville, and Francoise d'Orléans
 Another source claims the Marquis had an affair with Françoise de Blosset, resulting in daughter Francoise d'Orléans-Rothelin.
 Charlotte (1512–1549), Mademoiselle de Longueville prior to her marriage to Philippe, Duke of Nemours

References

Sources

1480 births
1516 deaths
Constables of France
Louis I d'Orleans
Grand Chamberlains of France
Ambassadors of France to England